The 2006 Oklahoma State Cowboys football team represented Oklahoma State University during the 2006 NCAA Division I FBS football season. They participated as members of the Big 12 Conference in the South Division. They played their home games at Boone Pickens Stadium in Stillwater, Oklahoma. They were coached by head coach Mike Gundy.

Schedule

Personnel

Coaching staff
 Head coach: Mike Gundy
 Assistants: Nelson Barnes, Vance Bedford (DC), Todd Bradford, Gunter Brewer, Joe DeForest, Larry Fedora (OC), Curtis Luper, Doug Meacham, Joe Wickline (OL)

Awards
 Big 12 Newcomer of the Year: Adarius Bowman, WR
 Big 12 Defensive Freshman of the Year: Andre Sexton, S
 All Big 12 First Team: Adarius Bowman (WR), Corey Hilliard (OL)
 All Big 12 Second Team: Victor DeGrate (DL), Matt Fodge (P)

References

Oklahoma State
Oklahoma State Cowboys football seasons
Independence Bowl champion seasons
Oklahoma State Cowboys football